Jean Hervé was a French rugby union player. He competed at the 1900 Summer Olympics and won gold as part of the French team in what was the first rugby union competition at an Olympic Games.

References

External links

Year of birth missing
Year of death missing
Olympic rugby union players of France
French rugby union players
Olympic gold medalists for France
Rugby union players at the 1900 Summer Olympics
Place of birth missing